Viktoria Schnaderbeck (born 4 January 1991) is an Austrian former professional footballer who last played for Arsenal in the FA WSL. She was  the captain of the Austrian national team. She previously played for FC Bayern Munich in Germany's Frauen-Bundesliga, LUV Graz in Austria's ÖFB-Frauenliga, and most recently for Tottenham Hotspur on loan from Arsenal in the FA WSL.

Club career
Schnaderbeck was with FC Bayern Munich since 2010, winning the league in the 2014–15 and 2015–16 seasons. She made 5 appearances in the UEFA Women's Champions League in 2015–16 and 2016–17 seasons. On 18 April 2016, Schnaderbeck extended her contract until 2018. After her contract with the German side ran out, she signed for Arsenal in May 2018. In January 2022, it was announced that Schnaderbeck had joined Tottenham Hotspur on loan for the rest of the 2021–22 season.

On 10 August in a joint press conference with Lisa Makas , Schanderbeck announced her retirement from professional football.

Personal life
Her cousin Sebastian Prödl is a former footballer who played as a centre-back. She has a girlfriend from Norway that moved to London.

Honours

Club 
Bayern München
 Bundesliga: 2014–15, 2015–16
 DFB-Pokal: 2012
 Bundesliga Cup: 2011
Arsenal

 FA WSL: 2018–19

International 
Austria
 Cyprus Cup: 2016

References

External links

Arsenal W.F.C profile

1991 births
Living people
Austrian women's footballers
Footballers from Graz
FC Bayern Munich (women) players
Austria women's international footballers
Expatriate women's footballers in Germany
Expatriate women's footballers in England
Austrian expatriate women's footballers
Austrian expatriate sportspeople in Germany
Austrian expatriate sportspeople in England
Women's association football midfielders
Frauen-Bundesliga players
Women's Super League players
Arsenal W.F.C. players
Austrian LGBT sportspeople
LGBT association football players
Lesbian sportswomen
ÖFB-Frauenliga players
DFC LUV Graz players
UEFA Women's Euro 2022 players
UEFA Women's Euro 2017 players